In fluid dynamics, the conjugate depths refer to the depth (y1) upstream and the depth (y2) downstream of the hydraulic jump whose momentum fluxes are equal for a given discharge (volume flux) q.  The depth upstream of a hydraulic jump is always supercritical.  It is important to note that the conjugate depth is different from the alternate depths for flow which are used in energy conservation calculations.

Mathematical derivation

Beginning with an equal momentum flux M and discharge q upstream and downstream of the hydraulic jump:

Rearranging terms gives:

Multiply to get a common denominator on the left-hand side and factor the right-hand side:

The (y2−y1) term cancels out:

Divide by y12

Thereafter multiply by y2 and expand the right hand side:

Substitute x for the constant y2/y1:

Solving the quadratic equation and multiplying it by  gives:

Substitute the constant y2/y1 back in for x to get the conjugate depth equation

 

Hydraulic engineering

Note that this equation is only applicable to hydraulic jumps over flat beds.